The Oxidising Angel is the first EP from German futurepop band Blutengel. It was released as a single CD. It featured a cover of Cry Little Sister the theme from the film The Lost Boys originally by Gerard McMann. On the original CD release, tracks 12 & 13 were hidden as part of track 11, The Oxidising Angel (Single Edit) which put the track time at 11:56. A music video was released for the title track, The Oxidising Angel.

Track listing

References

External links

2005 debut EPs
Blutengel albums